Hamburg is an unincorporated community in Ray Township, Franklin County, Indiana.

History
Hamburg was platted in 1864 by Wesley Martin. It was named after Hamburg, in Germany.

A post office was established at Hamburg in 1867, and remained in operation until it was discontinued in 1929.

Geography

References

Unincorporated communities in Franklin County, Indiana
Unincorporated communities in Indiana